Love, Timeless is a 2017 Taiwanese television series created and produced by Eastern Television. Starring Nick Chou, Summer Meng, Huang Wei Ting and Chang Chieh as the main cast. Filming began on February 24, 2017 and wrapped up on June 17, 2017. First original broadcast on TTV every Saturday at 10:00 pm starting April 15, 2017.

Synopsis
Life seems to be one misstep after another for 30 year-old Shi Zhao Yu (Nick Chou) ever since he lost that fateful basketball match to his college rival Li Jun Ren (Chang Chieh). He lost to him in love back in college, now he's about to lose his job.
Life is no easier for his former classmate Ruby Shen (Huang Wei Ting). The girl of every guy's dream in college is now trapped in a failed marriage. Feeling depressed, Ruby calls her former classmates to meet at the clock tower, where they once shared happy memories together in college. "If only I could go back in time, maybe my life would have been different." says Ruby before she jumps off the clock tower. Just as Zhao Yu falls from trying to save Ruby, he is transported back in time to his sophomore year in college. Zhao Yu now has a chance. The opportunity to save his first love and reverse the future is in our hero's grasp. But what does he really want: another shot with his college crush, or a love that he didn't even know existed before?

Cast

Main cast
Nick Chou as Shi Zhao Yu 時兆宇
Summer Meng as Zhao Kai Jia 趙凱佳
Huang Wei Ting 黃薇渟 as Shen Ruo Bi 沈若比 (Ruby)
Chang Chieh 張捷 as Li Jun Ren 李駿任

Supporting cast
Johnny Yang 楊銘威 as Liao Hai Meng 廖海盟
Lan Ya Yun 藍雅芸 as Wang Zhi Ni 王致妮
Lo Pei-An 羅北安 as Shi Can Zhi 時燦治
Miao Ke-li as Zhou Mei Guang

Special appearances
Lang Tsu-yun 郎祖筠 as You Xin Ying 尤欣穎
Jackson Lou 樓學賢 as Li Tai Yuan 李泰元
Debbie Chou 周丹薇 as Qiu Xuan Ai 邱萱愛
Lin Xiu Jun 林秀君 as Wen Xiu Mei 溫秀美
Louis Lin 林健寰 as Shen Jian De 沈建德
Joseph Ma 馬國賢 as General manager Xia 夏總
Ryan Kuo 郭鑫 as Bai Pin Ren 白品仁
Gao Kai Li 高凱莉 as Zhang Wei Yuan (Wei Wei) 張瑋媛 (瑋瑋)
Andy Wu 吳岳擎 as Li Ying Zhu 李英祝
Li Zheng Da 勵政達 as Zhang Da Qi 張大器
Zhu Jun Xian 朱俊憲 as Bo Ren 博仁
Lin Shuai Fu 林帥甫 as Long Zhu 龍珠
Lan Qi Rui 藍啟瑞 as basketball coach
Guo Bai Jie 郭柏傑 as Jin Mao 金毛
Jocelyn Chan 陳明憙
Luo Si Qi 羅思琦 as Zhao Xiong San 趙雄三
?? as Bing Zhong 秉中
Huang Yu-Chen 黃妤榛 as host

Soundtrack
Can't Let Go 不放 by Nick Chou 周湯豪
1064℃ by Jocelyn Chan 陳明憙
Caged Bird 囚鳥 by Jocelyn Chan 陳明憙
Final Solace 最後安慰 by Jocelyn Chan 陳明憙
I Say Baby by Nick Chou 周湯豪
Lover 情人 by Kelly Poon 潘嘉麗
Could Still Embrace 還能擁抱 by Kelly Poon 潘嘉麗
My Turn to Love 換我愛你 by Derrick Hoh 何維健

Broadcast

Episode ratings
Competing shows on rival channels airing at the same time slot were:
CTS - Genius Go Go Go
FTV - Just Dance
CTV - Mr. Player
PTS - Family Time, Lion Dance
EBC Variety - The Perfect Match
GTV - Q series: Boy Named Flora

References

External links
Love, Timeless TTV Website 
Love, Timeless EBC Website 
 

2017 Taiwanese television series debuts
2017 Taiwanese television series endings
Taiwan Television original programming
Eastern Television original programming
Taiwanese romance television series
Taiwanese time travel television series
Television series about multiple time paths